Ireland was represented by Johnny Logan with the song "Hold Me Now" in the 1987 Eurovision Song Contest in Brussels.

Before Eurovision

National final 
The event took place on 8 March 1987, at the Gaiety Theatre in Dublin. was hosted by RTÉ broadcaster Marty Whelan and former Irish Eurovision participant Maxi. Nine songs competed, and the winner was chosen by an "expert" jury, which included Linda Martin, who represented Ireland in 1984 and would do so again in 1992.

At Eurovision
The Eurovision Song Contest 1987 was held at the Palais du Centenaire, Eeuwfeestpaleis in Brussels, Belgium.

"Hold Me Now" was performed twentieth in the running order on the night of the contest, following Denmark and preceding Yugoslavia, which meant that Johnny performed third last, as he had done in 1980. The song went on to win the contest with 172 points, a substantial 31-point margin over Germany. Germany was also runner-up to Johnny Logan seven years previously. Although many former winners have returned to perform at the contest, Logan is the only singer to have won the Eurovision Song Contest twice.

Marty Whelan provided the RTÉ television commentary with Larry Gogan providing the commentary for RTÉ Radio 1 listeners. Brendan Balfe served as the spokesperson for the Irish jury.

Voting

Congratulations: 50 Years of the Eurovision Song Contest

"Hold Me Now" was one of fourteen Eurovision songs chosen by fans to participate in the Congratulations 50th anniversary special in 2005. It was one of two Irish entries, both by Logan, to feature in the show (the other being "What's Another Year?"). Ireland had a strong presence in the show, as besides Logan's two entries, the show also included former winners Linda Martin, Charlie McGettigan, and Eimear Quinn as backing vocalists (all of whom also had a medley to perform their winning entries), and interval acts from 1997 co-host Ronan Keating, 1994 interval act Riverdance, and Logan himself, performing his then-new single "When a Woman Loves a Man." The show was broadcast live by RTÉ with commentary by Marty Whelan.

"Hold Me Now" was drawn to appear twelfth, following "Ne partez pas sans moi" by Celine Dion (the winner after Logan) and preceding "Save Your Kisses for Me" by Brotherhood of Man. Like the majority of performances that evening, it was largely played out with a dance troupe appearing alongside footage of Logan's 1987 performance. Near the end of the performance, Logan appeared and lip-synced the last chorus. At the end of the first round, "Hold Me Now" was announced as one of the songs proceeding to the second round. It was later revealed that "Hold Me Now" finished third, with 182 points.

In the final round, "Hold Me Now" held its third place, with an improved score of 262 points. In both the first and second round, Ireland was able to award themselves twelve points, a practice usually not allowed in standard Eurovision editions.

Voting

References

1987
Countries in the Eurovision Song Contest 1987
Eurovision
Eurovision